Maradhoo Feydhoo School is a school located in Maradhoo-Feydhoo, a district of Addu City in the Maldives.

At present, there are around 14 teachers and fewer than 2000 students under the leadership of Mrs Fathimath Hafsa, Principal. There are seven classroom buildings, one Hall class room and one administrative building.

The school is soon going to be closed down.

References

External links
 

Schools in the Maldives